Marianne Gordon (born 23 July 1946) is an American actress. Her filmography includes supporting roles in How to Stuff a Wild Bikini (1965), Rosemary's Baby (1968), Little Darlings (1980), The Being (1983) and The Giant of Thunder Mountain (1991), among others. She was also a cast member of Hee Haw for many years.

Gordon's first husband was Playboy producer Michael Trikilis.

She later married Kenny Rogers. Gordon and Rogers had one son together, Christopher Cody Rogers (born 1981). Rogers and Gordon were married for 16 years, and during this time she took his name and thus is known as Marianne Rogers.

Partial filmography
How to Stuff a Wild Bikini (1965) - Chickie
The Legend of Blood Mountain (1965) - Girl drinking Pepsi at party
The Oscar (1966) - Bikini Girl (uncredited)
Thoroughly Modern Millie (1967) - Lovely Blonde Girl (uncredited)
Three Guns for Texas (1968) - Lady with Packages (uncredited)
Rosemary's Baby (1968) - Joan Jellico, Rosemary's Girl Friend
The Love Machine (1971) - Model (uncredited)
Little Darlings (1980) - Mrs. Whitney
The Being (1983) - Laurie
The Giant of Thunder Mountain (1991) - Alicia Wilson

References

External links
 

1946 births
Living people
Actresses from Georgia (U.S. state)
People from Athens, Georgia
American film actresses
American television actresses
21st-century American women